The Golden Key International Honour Society (formerly Golden Key National Honor Society) is an Atlanta, Georgia-based non-profit organization founded in 1977 to recognize academic achievement among college and university students.

Golden Key has chapters at colleges and universities in Australia, The Bahamas, Canada, India, Malaysia, New Zealand, Singapore, South Africa, and the United States. Membership into Golden Key is offered to undergraduate and graduate students recognized to be among the top 15% of their class by GPA.

History
Golden Key National Honour Society was founded by James W. Lewis at Georgia State University in Atlanta, Georgia in 1977. The original intent of the society was to create a new academic honor organization that was the equal of longstanding honor societies such as Phi Beta Kappa, but which did not carry the same perceived elitism of older institutions, operating more strictly on merit standards (by accepting students in the top 15% of their college classes, and permitting part-time and transfer students who excelled academically). The society expanded over the course of the 1980s on a minimal budget, increasing the number of schools at which it had chapters and membership at those chapters. Lewis moved the institution's headquarters to a former Church of Christ Scientist building in the Druid Hills area of Atlanta in 1984. In the late 1980s, the society began attracting corporate sponsorships, providing data about its students to its sponsors, and holding large sponsored networking events, arguing that the strategy increased students' competitiveness in the job market. It expanded to Australia in the mid-1990s, and in 2000 changed its name to Golden Key International Honour Society in order "to reflect [its] international presence".

Lewis, who by the late 1990s was making more than $300,000 as chairman of the organization, stepped down in January 2000 after being pressured by his board, and was replaced by Carl Patton. Patton resigned in 2002 after a round of negative press coverage about the society. By 2002, the society was "one of the largest collegiate honor societies in the world", with an annual budget of US$10.9 million and over 120,000 inductees annually.

Countries
Golden Key has started chapters in the following countries:

1977 – United States of America
1993 – Australia
1997 – Canada
1998 – Malaysia
1999 – New Zealand
2000 – South Africa
2010 – The Bahamas
2011 – India

Membership and activities
Golden Key's main office is in Atlanta, Georgia, with regional offices in Sydney, Australia, and Pretoria, South Africa. It manages approximately 400 campus chapters worldwide. In its early years, Golden Key anticipated volunteerism drives on college campuses by organizing community service efforts, such as working in soup kitchens, reading to children at libraries, and doing tax preparation help for low-income and immigrant populations. Since chapters are not centrally managed, charity and volunteer efforts are now fostered through a system called SPARK a Change, which allows chapters to determine the causes they support and the level of involvement of students. Golden Key offers résumé and graduate program assistance, career planning and opportunities, leadership opportunities in local chapters, and networking events. It also offers scholarships, awards, research grants, travel support for academic conference attendance, and student loan debt relief to its members.

The organization operates as a non-profit under section 501(c)(3) of the U.S. Internal Revenue Code. Golden Key sought and was denied acceptance to the Association of College Honor Societies in 1984 and 1997. Golden Key was accepted by the ACHS in 2005. Golden Key resigned from the Association of College Honor Societies in December 2013 after what the ACHS indicated was "a series of on-going discussions and correspondence."

Criticism
A 1999 article in the University of British Columbia student newspaper, The Ubyssey, examined the society's finances and scholarship practices after it established a chapter on campus in 1998. Ubyssey obtained the organization's IRS filings for 1997 and noted "Golden Key spent just $289,461 (US dollars) on scholarships, less than 5 per cent of their total expenditures for the fiscal year ending June 30, 1997." Golden Key reported on its own website in 2009 that it had increased scholarship disbursals to over $500,000 annually, but a later report indicated that spending on member events and scholarships in 2014 were less than $200,000. A 2002 report by The Chronicle of Higher Education reported that there were conflicts within the society's administration over the lowering of academic standards required for admission and inflated recruitment numbers from local university chapters. The society's aggressive marketing techniques toward eligible members were criticized in 2002 by the president of the National Collegiate Honors Council.

The business practices of Golden Key also attracted the Chronicle's notice, as well as that of The Washington Post. Sponsoring corporations, who paid a minimum of $55,000 a year (2002) to access Golden Key's membership lists, sent students "mass mailings for such products as credit cards and auto insurance." Golden Key responded to these criticisms by stating that it was standard practice among alumni groups and honor societies. The Chronicle quoted former employees who thought the institution's expenditures on parties and upper executive salaries, as well as its maintenance of the Druid Hills headquarters, were lavish and inconsistent with the former ideal of "a student-centered, nonprofit organization." The Atlanta Journal-Constitution reported poor accounting practices under Lewis's tenure in the late 1990s, and investigators were unable to determine exactly how much he was paid due to bookkeeping discrepancies. A 2016 investigation by Australian student newspaper Honi Soit found that Golden Key continued to release data about students, without their consent, to corporate sponsors.

Some students reported to student newspaper investigators that they were unsure of the society's benefits or did not find the society's networking opportunities worth the cost of membership. Honi Soit also noted that society staffers altered the Golden Key International Honour Society Wikipedia page to burnish the institution's image.

References

External links 
 

1977 establishments in Georgia (U.S. state)
Student organizations established in 1977
Non-profit organizations based in Georgia (U.S. state)
Honor societies
Former members of Association of College Honor Societies